Carl Alexander Speare (1952-2009), was a male boxer who competed for England.

Boxing career
Speare represented England and won a bronze medal in the middleweight (-73 Kg) division, at the 1974 British Commonwealth Games in Christchurch, New Zealand.

He turned professional on 22 April 1974 and fought in 17 fights until 1978.

References

1952 births
2009 deaths
English male boxers
Commonwealth Games medallists in boxing
Commonwealth Games bronze medallists for England
Boxers at the 1974 British Commonwealth Games
Middleweight boxers
Medallists at the 1974 British Commonwealth Games